Peter Christensen may refer to:

Peter Christensen (born 1975), Danish politician for Venstre
Peter F. Christensen (born 1952), American prelate and bishop
Peter Gade Christensen (born 1976), Danish badminton player
Peter H. Christensen, American art historian 
Peter Seier Christensen (born 1967), Danish politician for The New Right

See also

Peter Christiansen (disambiguation)
Christensen (surname)